William Clavering may refer to:

William Clavering-Cowper, 2nd Earl Cowper
Sir William Clavering, 9th Baronet, High Sheriff of Durham

See also
Clavering (surname)